Laetifautor spinulosus, common name the spine top shell, is a species of sea snail, a marine gastropod mollusk, in the family Calliostomatidae within the superfamily Trochoidea, the top snails, turban snails and their allies.

Description
The height of the shell attains 7 mm.

Distribution
This marine species occurs off Southern Australia and Western Australia.

References

 Allan, J. (1950). Australian Shells: with related animals living in the sea, in freshwater and on the land. Melbourne : Georgian House. xix 470 pp.
 Cotton, B.C. (1959). South Australian Mollusca. Archaeogastropoda. Adelaide : Govt. Printer. pp. 1–449.
 Wilson, B. (1993). Australian Marine Shells. Prosobranch Gastropods. Kallaroo, WA : Odyssey Publishing. Vol.1 1st Edn pp. 1–408.

spinulosus
Gastropods described in 1893